The Swedish thrash metal pioneers Maninnya Blade was formed in the early 1980s, and is now considered to be one of the first thrash metal bands from Sweden.

The singles "Barbarian" and "Ripper Attack" were released in 1984, and the full-length vinyl "Merchants In Metal" in 1986 prior to splitting up.

Included were earlier unreleased demo tracks on the 2001 album "A Demonic Mistress from the Past" as well as live tracks from 2002 on the 2006 2CD release "Undead, Unborn, Alive".

References

Swedish musical groups
Swedish thrash metal musical groups